Lawrence is a city in Marion County, Indiana, United States. It is one of four "excluded cities" in Marion County. The city is home to Fort Benjamin Harrison within Fort Harrison State Park. The population was 46,001 at the 2010 census. The city is on the northeast side of Indianapolis and is currently growing at twice the rate of the rest of Indiana.

History
The municipality was platted in 1849 under the name Lanesville but other names were tried because there was already another Lanesville in Indiana. The name Jamestown, in honor of the town's founder James White, was used for a while, but in 1866 the Marion County Commissioners approved the name Lawrence, which is also the name of the township in which it is located. Lawrence was named after the naval hero of the War of 1812, Captain James Lawrence In 1929 the citizens of Lawrence voted to become an independent town, where they first established the town marshal, as well as other parts of government. 

In 1969, Indianapolis and Marion County adopted a unified government structure known as Unigov. Lawrence is one of four “excluded cities” and therefore retains its own municipal government. Its citizens vote not only for the mayor and council of Lawrence, but also for the mayor of Indianapolis and representatives on the Indianapolis City-County Council.

Geography
Lawrence is located at  (39.862739, −85.994264).

Climate
The climate in this area is characterized by hot, humid summers and generally mild to cold winters. According to the Köppen Climate Classification system, Lawrence has a humid continental climate with hot summers and year around precipitation, abbreviated "Dfa" on climate maps.

Demographics

2010 census
At the 2010 United States Census, there were 46,001 people, 17,864 households, and 11,949 families in the city. The racial makeup of the city was 63.2% White, 25.8% African American, 0.4% Native American, 1.4% Asian, 0.1% Pacific Islander, 5.7% from other races, and 3.5% from two or more races. Hispanic or Latino of any race were 11.2%.

Of the 17,864 households 38.7% had children under the age of 18 living with them, 44.2% were married couples living together, 17.5% had a female householder with no husband present, 5.3% had a male householder with no wife present, and 33.1% were non-families. 27.6% of households were one person and 8% were one person aged 65 or older. The average household size was 2.56 and the average family size was 3.12.

The median age was 34.2 years. 28.2% of residents were under the age of 18; 8.1% were between the ages of 18 and 24; 29.3% were from 25 to 44; 24.9% were from 45 to 64; and 9.6% were 65 or older. The gender makeup of the city was 47.5% male and 52.5% female.

The median household income was $54,254 in Lawrence compared to the state median of $48,393. Roughly 31% of Lawrence residents have a bachelor's degree compared to 22.7% of all Indiana residents.

2000 census
At the 2000 United States Census, there were 38,915 people, 14,853 households, and 10,337 families in the city. The racial makeup of the city was 78.58% White, 15.51% African American, 0.30% Native American, 1.80% Asian, 0.08% Pacific Islander, 1.86% from other races, and 1.87% from two or more races. Hispanic or Latino of any race were 4.73%.

Of the 14,853 households 39.8% had children under the age of 18 living with them, 52.1% were married couples living together, 13.0% had a female householder with no husband present, and 30.4% were non-families. 24.8% of households were one person and 5.9% were one person aged 65 or older. The average household size was 2.60 and the average family size was 3.13.

The population was diversified at 29.9% under the age of 18, 7.7% from 18 to 24, 36.2% from 25 to 44, 18.0% from 45 to 64, and 8.2% 65 or older. The median age was 32 years. For every 100 females, there were 95.2 males. For every 100 females age 18 and over, there were 91.3 males.

The median household income was $47,838 and the median family income  was $56,609. Males had a median income of $38,924 versus $30,406 for females. The per capita income for the city was $22,543. About 4.8% of families and 6.7% of the population were below the poverty line, including 8.2% of those under age 18 and 5.1% of those age 65 or over.

Education
The Lawrence Township school district is the ninth largest and one of the fastest growing districts in the state. It operates four Early Learning Centers, eleven elementary magnet schools (grades 1–6), two middle schools (grades 7–8), two high schools (Lawrence Central and Lawrence North), a center for innovation and technology, and an alternative setting high school. In the 2018–2019 academic year there were 16,035 students with a high school graduation rate of 92.7%. Lawrence Township schools offer high ability programs, Advanced Placement (AP and ACP), International Baccalaureate Program, vocational and career education programs, and bilingual programs. The district holds 45 state championships and 5 national titles in various inter-curricular competitions. Those titles include championships in basketball (Lawrence North - 2006) and marching band (Lawrence Central -1998, 2001 and 2004). The diversity makeup of the district is .05% American Indian, 23.5% White, 45.3% Black, 6.9% Multiracial, 1.1% Asian, .05% Pacific Islander, and 23.1% Hispanic, as of the 2017–18 school year. Lawrence also has a public library, a branch of the Indianapolis Public Library.

Notable residents
 Mike Conley, basketball player
 Greg Oden, basketball player
 John Slagle, baseball player
 Forrest Landis, actor
 Pat McAfee, sports radio host, All-Pro NFL Punter for the Indianapolis Colts

References

External links

 
 Lawrence Chamber of Commerce
 Visit Lawrence

Cities in Indiana
Cities in Marion County, Indiana
Indianapolis metropolitan area